All Through the Night may refer to:

Albums 
 All Through the Night (The Sand Band album), 2011
 All Through the Night: Julie London Sings the Choicest of Cole Porter, 1965

Songs 
 "All Through the Night" (folk song) or "Ar Hyd y Nos", a Welsh folk song
 "All Through the Night" (Cole Porter song), 1934
 "All Through the Night" (Cyndi Lauper song), 1984
 "All Through the Night" (Tone Lōc song), 1991
 "All Through the Night", by Donna Summer from Bad Girls
 "All Through the Night", by Gentle Giant from Civilian
 "All Through the Night", by Joanne Accom from Do Not Disturb
 "All Through the Night", by Kasabian from For Crying Out Loud
 "All Through the Night", by Raspberries from Starting Over

Other uses 
 All Through the Night (film), a 1942 American thriller directed by Vincent Sherman
 All Through the Night (Žmuidzinavičius), a 1906 painting by Antanas Žmuidzinavičius
 All Through the Night, a 1998 novel by Mary Higgins Clark
 All Through the Night, a 2007 novel by Suzanne Brockmann

See also 
 "All Thru the Nite", a song by P.O.V. and Jade